Woodmere is a neighborhood in northwest Baltimore, Maryland.

Transportation

Rogers Avenue station on the Baltimore Metro SubwayLink line is located within Woodmere.

References

Neighborhoods in Baltimore
Northwest Baltimore